Statistics of Úrvalsdeild in the 1973 season.

Overview
It was contested by 8 teams, and Keflavík won the championship. Valur's Hermann Gunnarsson was the top scorer with 17 goals.

League standings

Results
Each team played every opponent once home and away for a total of 14 matches.

References

Úrvalsdeild karla (football) seasons
Iceland
Iceland
1973 in Icelandic football